The Armenian First League is currently the second level football competition in Armenia after the Armenian Premier League. The competition exists mostly out of reserve teams of several Premier League clubs; however, other teams also participate. The reserve teams are not eligible for promotion to the highest level, resulting in situations where a club promotes even when they finish the season in a mid-table position.

2021–22 Member Clubs

Winners 

 
 

 
2
Second level football leagues in Europe